There is a significant community of Lebanese people in Senegal.

Migration history
The first trader from Ottoman Lebanon arrived in French Senegal in the 1860s. However, early migration was slow; by 1900, there were only about one hundred Lebanese living in the country, mostly Shiite Muslims from the vicinity of Tyre. They worked as street vendors in Dakar, Saint-Louis and Rufisque. After World War I, they began to move into the peanut trade. With the establishment of the French Mandate of Lebanon, Lebanese immigration expanded sharply. During the Great Depression and again after World War II, French traders lobbied the government to restrict Lebanese immigration; however, the government generally ignored such lobbying.

Interethnic relations
During the colonial period, the Lebanese tended to support independence movements. Their social position outside of the colonial relationship, as neither colonist nor colonised, enabled them to maintain good relations with both Senegalese consumers as well as the large French businessmen. After Senegal gained independence in 1960, most French small traders left the country; however, indigenous Senegalese people began to compete increasingly with the Lebanese in the peanut sector, and soon after, the whole peanut marketing sector was nationalised.

Lebanese migrants and their descendants have tended to maintain dual citizenship of both Lebanon and Senegal. Most speak Arabic, Wolof and French, and some have become involved in Senegalese politics. However, they are a fairly endogamous community.

In the early 2000s, the Lebanese began to be displaced from their position as a market-dominant minority by the influx of Chinese traders and the cheap goods they brought from China; as a result, the Lebanese began to shift to a pattern of buying goods from the Chinese and reselling them in remote areas of the country where no Chinese migrants lived.

See also
 Arab diaspora
 Lebanese diaspora
 Lebanese people in Ivory Coast
 Lebanese people in South Africa
 Lebanese people in Sierra Leone
 Shia Islam in Senegal
 Christianity in Senegal

Notes

Bibliography

Further reading

Lebanese diaspora in Africa
Senegal